Space Shuttle (full title: Space Shuttle: Pinball Adventure) is a Space Shuttle themed pinball machine designed by Barry Oursler and Joe Kaminkow and produced in 1984 by Williams Electronics. The machine's marketing slogan is "The fastest way to make your earnings really take off!".  It is notable for its central ramp shot up a feature themed after the Space Shuttle.  A sequel, Space Station: Pinball Rendezvous, was released in 1987.

Gameplay
In Space Shuttle the main goal is to acquire the shuttle score value from spelling out "S H U T T L E" by hitting six stand up targets and one drop target - or by using the lit inlanes (if available).

The reward for the shuttle score value is assigned randomly with each new ball, or by hitting a stand up target, at the top of a short ramp. It will be one of the following:
50,000 points plus a bonus holdover, 
an extra ball (a score award is given if 5 extra balls are earned during game), 
a special,
100,000 points,
50,000 points,
20,000 points, or
100,000 points plus lite outlanes, which will give another shuttle score value if the ball goes down one of the outlanes

Additionally three lights labeled U, S and A are lit when a ball rolls over them. They are worth 2,000 points each. Spelling USA increases the end of ball bonus multiplier (a multiplication factor for points earned and awarded when the ball in play drains), up to 7X. There are three jet bumpers that are worth 100 points when unlit and 1,000 points when lit. Two or three ball multiball is started by hitting one ball up a ball lock or two balls up two different ball locks and then shooting a ball up the center ramp when the drop target is down.

Game quotes
 "Airlock open!"
 "Ready for liftoff!"

Digital versions
The table is included in FarSight Studios' 2008 video game Pinball Hall of Fame: The Williams Collection, but not in the six year-long collection of Williams pinball tables formerly playable in FarSight's The Pinball Arcade (2012-2018).

References

External links
 IPDB Listing for Space Shuttle

1984 pinball machines
Williams pinball machines